Louis J. Guillette Jr., Ph.D. (died 2015) was an American professor of embryology.  Dr. Guillette received the 17th Annual Heinz Award with special focus on the environment in 2011.

Early life

References

American embryologists
Medical University of South Carolina faculty
University of Florida faculty
University of Colorado Boulder alumni
2015 deaths